Ronald Stuart Ballantyne (birth unknown) is a New Zealand former professional rugby league footballer who played in the 1960s.

International honours
Ballantyne represented New Zealand in 1967 against Australia.

References

External links

Search for "Ballantyne" at rugbyleagueproject.org

Living people
New Zealand national rugby league team players
New Zealand rugby league players
Northland rugby league team players
Place of birth missing (living people)
Rugby league five-eighths
Rugby league players from Northland Region
Year of birth missing (living people)